Mesturus is an extinct genus of ray-finned fish from the Jurassic.

References

Jurassic bony fish
Pycnodontiformes genera
Fossils of France
Jurassic fish of Europe